This is a list of free  information retrieval libraries, which are libraries used in software development for performing it retrieval functions.  It is not a complete list of such libraries, but is instead a list of free information retrieval libraries with articles on Wikipedia. It does not include commercial software libraries.

Libraries for searching and indexing
Lemur
Lucene
Solr
Elasticsearch
Manatee
Sphinx
Terrier Search Engine
Xapian

Lists of software